Ivan Grigoryevich Istomin (February 7, 1917 – 1988) was a Nenets and Komi writer.

Personal life 
Istomin was born into a family of Komi fishermen. In 1934, he graduated from the seven-year middle school in Muzhi. He graduated with distinction from the national pedagogical institute in Salekhard four years later, in 1938. While studying at the pedagogical institute, he helped organize the institute’s literary society.

Career 
From 1938 to 1950, he taught Russian, Nenets and drawing at schools in the Yamalo-Nenets Autonomous Okrug. After that, he worked as the sub-editor for the Nenets-language newspaper "Nyaryana Ngerm". In 1955, he was admitted to the Soviet Union of Writers. From 1958 to 1965, he served as the assistant managing editor of national literature at the Tyumen Publishing House.

In 1936, a local newspaper published his first poem ”Reindeer”. Later on, his poems and short stories were published in literary magazines such as Siberian Lights, Druzhba Narodov, Ural, Neva, Voyvyv kodzuv. In 1953, Our North, Istomin’s first anthology of Nenets poems, was published as a stand-alone edition. Since then, more than 20 editions of his short stories, novellas, and novels, including his novels Zhivun and Vstany-trava, have been published in Russian, Nenets and Komi. In addition to his literary talents, Istomin also studied painting and two of his paintings are on display in the local museum in Salehkard.

Honours and awards
 Order of the Badge of Honour (February 2, 1967)

See also
 Yamal to Its Descendants
 Maria Barmich

References 
 Yamal writers - Istomin

Nenets-language writers
Komi-language writers
Nenets-language poets
Komi-language poets
20th-century Russian writers
People from Yamalo-Nenets Autonomous Okrug
1917 births
1988 deaths
Soviet poets
Russian male poets
Soviet male writers
20th-century Russian male writers
Soviet short story writers
Soviet novelists
20th-century short story writers